Ullensvang is a municipality in Vestland county, Norway. It is located in the traditional district of Hardanger. The administrative centre is the town of Odda. Some of the notable villages in the municipality include Lofthus, Utne, Vikebygd, Alsåker, Botnen, Eitrheim, Håra, Røldal, Seljestad, Skare, Tyssedal, Jondal, Herand, Kysnesstranda, and Torsnes.

The main inhabited part of Ullensvang municipality lies just to the west of Hardangervidda National Park, which covers most of the Hardangervidda plateau, Europe's largest mountain plateau. Most inhabitants live in the narrow coastal mountainsides and valleys along the Hardangerfjorden and Sørfjorden. The largest urban areas in Ullensvang are Odda, Kinsarvik, Jondal, and Lofthus. The Norwegian National Road 13 and the European route E134 are the two main roads through the municipality. National road 13 crosses the Hardangerfjorden via the Hardanger Bridge in the far northern part of the municipality.

The  municipality is the 12th largest by area out of the 356 municipalities in Norway. Ullensvang is the 104th most populous municipality in Norway with a population of 10,881. The number of inhabitants has shown a decrease of several hundred people since 1980. This development can be seen in light of the general depopulation of rural Norway.

In 2016, the chief of police for Vestlandet formally suggested a reconfiguration of police districts and stations. He proposed that the police station for Ullensvang og Eidfjord be closed.

General information

Name
The municipality (originally the parish) is named after the old Ullensvang farm, since Ullensvang Church was built there. The first element is the genitive case of the name of the Norse god Ullin (sideform of Ullr). The last element is vangr which means "field" or "meadow".

Prior to the 2020 municipal merger, this municipality was called Ullensvang herad, but after the merger it was called Ullensvang kommune.

Coat of arms
The coat of arms was granted on 8 November 1979. The arms are red with a horizontal gold stripe across the middle, with three gold fleur-de-lis designs (two above the stripe, one below). The municipal arms are derived from the arms of nobleman from the area, Sigurd Brynjulvsson Galte, and they can be seen on his gravestone dating back to 1302 at the local church. As it is the oldest gravestone in the church, the arms were well known in the village, hence the choice for the arms of this knight as municipal arms.

On 1 January 2020, the arms were modified by changing the colors from red and gold to blue and white after a large municipal merger.

Churches
The Church of Norway has eight parishes within the municipality of Ullensvang. It is part of the Hardanger og Voss prosti (deanery) in the Diocese of Bjørgvin.

History

{{Historical populations
|footnote = Source: Statistics Norway.Note: there were major border changes to the municipality in 1964 and 1977 causing large changes in the population.
|shading = on
|1951|2294
|1960|2420
|1970|4848
|1980|4041
|1990|3988
|2000|3562
|2010|3382
|2020|11152
}}
On 1 January 1838, the large parish of Kinsarvik was established as a municipality (see formannskapsdistrikt law). The large parish was made up of the main parish and the annex of Ullensvang. On 1 January 1869, Ullensvang became the main parish and Kinsarvik became an annex to Ullensvang. At this time the municipality changed its name to Ullensvang. On 1 January 1882, a small area of Ullensvang (population: 22) was transferred to the neighboring municipality of Vikør. On 1 July 1913, the municipality of Ullensvang was divided into three parts: the northwestern part became Kinsarvik Municipality, the southern part became Odda Municipality, and the rest remained as Ullensvang Municipality, albeit much smaller. This left Ullensvang with 1,941 residents.

During the 1960s, there were many municipal mergers across Norway due to the work of the Schei Committee. On 1 January 1964, the following areas were merged into one large municipality: all of Ullensvang Municipality, all of Eidfjord Municipality, and most of Kinsarvik Municipality (except for the Lussand-Kvanndal area which went to Granvin Municipality). The newly enlarged municipality was named Ullensvang. On 1 January 1965, the Åsgrenda area of Kvam Municipality (population: 61) was transferred to Ullensvang. This new, large municipality of Ullensvang that was created in 1964-1965 was not long-lived. On 1 January 1977, the area that once was Eidfjord Municipality became its own municipality once again. This left Ullensvang with 3,937 residents.

On 1 January 2020, the three neighboring municipalities of Jondal, Odda, and Ullensvang were merged into a new, larger Ullensvang Municipality. At that time, the administrative centre was moved from the village of Kinsarvik to the larger town of Odda. On 1 January 2022, the Ytre Bu area of Ullensvang (population: 24) was transferred to the neighboring Eidfjord Municipality.

Geography

The municipality of Ullensvang is located on the shores of the Hardangerfjorden and the Sørfjorden and it stretches all the way up to the Folgefonna glacier inside Folgefonna National Park on the Folgefonna peninsula in the western part of the municipality. It continues up to the vast Hardangervidda plateau in the east, including part of the Hardangervidda National Park. The lakes Kvensjøen and Veivatnet as well as the mountain Hårteigen are all located in Ullensvang on the plateau.

Climate
The lowland areas of Ullensvang near the Hardanger fjord has a temperate oceanic climate (marine west coast climate, Cfb in the Köppen climate classification). The driest season is April - August, while the wettest is October - March. The all-time high temperature is  recorded 28 July 2019; the all-time low is  recorded 9 February 1966.
The weather station Ullensvang Forsøksgard has been recording temperature since 1865.

Government
All municipalities in Norway, including Ullensvang, are responsible for primary education (through 10th grade), outpatient health services, senior citizen services, unemployment and other social services, zoning, economic development, and municipal roads. The municipality is governed by a municipal council of elected representatives, which in turn elects a mayor.  The municipality falls under the Hordaland District Court and the Gulating Court of Appeal.

Municipal council
The municipal council of Ullensvang is made up of 33 representatives that are elected to four year terms. The party breakdown of the council is as follows:

Mayor
The mayors of Ullensvang (incomplete list):
2019–present: Roald Aga Haug (Ap)
2003-2019: Solfrid Borge (Sp)

 Notable people 
 Public service 

 Nils Christian Egede Hertzberg (1827 in Ullensvang – 1911) theologian, educator and politician
 Knud Knudsen (1832 in Odda – 1915) one of Norway's first professional photographers 
 Halldor O. Opedal (1895 in Lofthus – 1986) a Norwegian teacher and folklorist
 Eiliv Austlid (1899 in Ullensvang – 1940) a Norwegian farmer and army officer
 Torbjørn Mork (1928 in Odda – 1992) a Norwegian physician and civil servant
 la mamma (1971 in Odda) a beautiful mother

 The Arts 
 Nils Tjoflot (1865 in Tjoflot – 1898) a Norwegian violinist
 Georg Brochmann (1894 in Ullensvang – 1952) journalist, writer and playwright
 Zinken Hopp (1905 in Ullensvang – 1987) a Norwegian author, poet and playwright
 Claes Gill (1910 in Odda - 1973) a Norwegian author, poet and actor 
 Anne B. Ragde (born 1957 in Odda) a Norwegian novelist 
 Frode Grytten (born 1960) a Norwegian writer and journalist, he grew up in Odda
 Knut Olav Åmås (born 1968 in Odda) a Norwegian writer, editor and politician
 Svein Olav Herstad (born 1969 in Odda) a jazz pianist
 Leif Einar Lothe (born 1969 in Odda) a Norwegian TV personality, stage name Lothepus''
 Marit Eikemo (born 1971 in Odda) an essayist, novelist, journalist and magazine editor
 Rannveig Djønne (born 1974 in Djønno) a Norwegian folk musician

Sport 
 Roger Albertsen (1957–2003) a football midfielder with over 300 club caps and 25 for Norway
 Håkon Opdal (born 1982 in Odda) a footballer with over 350 club caps and 12 for Norway

Attractions

Ullensvang is Norway's biggest supplier of fruit, especially sweet cherries and apples. Every summer a cherry festival is held at Lofthus, where the Norwegian championship of cherry stone spitting is held. Each May, a musical festival is held at Ullensvang Hotel (built in 1846), when musicians from all of Norway come to the village. The famous composer Edvard Grieg spent many summers at Lofthus, and the festival is held in his honor. During the summer, the population is doubled due to tourism. Attractions in addition to the previous mentioned, are the medieval Ullensvang Church at Lofthus (built around 1250) and Kinsarvik Church (built around 1150), several waterfalls such as the Skrikjofossen, the flowering season in May, and museums at Aga, Utne, and Skredhaugen.

References

External links

Municipal fact sheet from Statistics Norway 

 
Municipalities of Vestland
1838 establishments in Norway